Supplemental Streaming SIMD Extensions 3 (SSSE3 or SSE3S) is a SIMD instruction set created by Intel and is the fourth iteration of the SSE technology.

History 
SSSE3 was first introduced with Intel processors based on the Core microarchitecture on June 26, 2006 with the "Woodcrest" Xeons.

SSSE3 has been referred to by the codenames Tejas New Instructions (TNI) or Merom New Instructions (MNI) for the first processor designs intended to support it.

Functionality  
SSSE3 contains 16 new discrete instructions. Each instruction can act on 64-bit MMX or 128-bit XMM registers. Therefore, Intel's materials refer to 32 new instructions. They include:

 Twelve instructions that perform horizontal addition or subtraction operations.
 Six instructions that evaluate absolute values.
 Two instructions that perform multiply-and-add operations and speed up the evaluation of dot products.
 Two instructions that accelerate packed integer multiply operations and produce integer values with scaling.
 Two instructions that perform a byte-wise, in-place shuffle according to the second shuffle control operand.
 Six instructions that negate packed integers in the destination operand if the corresponding element in the source operand is negative.
 Two instructions that align data from the composite of two operands.

CPUs with SSSE3 

AMD:
 "Cat" low-power processors 
 Bobcat-based processors
 Jaguar-based processors and newer 
 Puma-based processors and newer 
 "Heavy Equipment" processors 
 Bulldozer-based processors 
 Piledriver-based processors 
 Steamroller-based processors 
 Excavator-based processors and newer 
Zen-based processors
 Zen+-based processors
 Zen2-based processors
 Zen3-based processors
 Zen4-based processors
Intel:
Xeon 5100 Series
Xeon 5300 Series
Xeon 5400 Series
Xeon 3000 Series
Core 2 Duo
Core 2 Extreme
Core 2 Quad
Core i7
Core i5
Core i3
Pentium Dual Core (if 64-bit capable; Allendale onwards)
Celeron 4xx Sequence Conroe-L
Celeron Dual Core E1200
Celeron M 500 series
Atom
VIA:
Nano

New instructions

In the table below, satsw(X) (read as 'saturate to signed word') takes a signed integer X, and converts it to −32768 if it is less than −32768, to +32767 if it is greater than 32767, and leaves it unchanged otherwise. As normal for the Intel architecture, bytes are 8 bits, words 16 bits, and dwords 32 bits; 'register' refers to an MMX or XMM vector register.

See also
SIMD
SSE3
Intel Core 2
Tejas and Jayhawk
x86 instruction listings

References

External links
Core 2 Mobile specifications
Intel white-paper admitting the existence of SSSE3 and describing SSE4
Instruction set documentation listing the functions of the SSSE3 instructions

X86 instructions
SIMD computing